Betty Steinberg (1910-1965) was an American film and television editor active primarily in the 1950s and 1960s.

Biography 
Steinberg was born on March 5, 1910, to Moshe "Aaron" and Sarah Steinberg. She was the twin sister of future film executive Abe Steinberg; their sister Rose later became a script supervisor at Fox. She died in Los Angeles, California, in 1965.

Selected filmography 

 Escape from Hell Island (1963)
 The Second Time Around (1961)
 Madison Avenue (1961)
 Swingin' Along (1961)
 Twelve Hours to Kill (1960)
 The Miracle of the Hills (1959)
 The Abductors (1957)
 The Killing (1956)
 The Siege at Red River (1954)
 The Twonky (1953)

References

External links

American film editors
American women film editors
1910 births
1965 deaths